The Sinta Quartet is an American saxophone quartet, founded at the University of Michigan School of Music, Theatre & Dance in November 2010. All members of the quartet studied with the group's namesake, University of Michigan Professor of Saxophone Donald Sinta. The group's members are:

 Dan Graser - soprano saxophone
 Zachary Stern - alto saxophone
 Joseph Girard - tenor saxophone
 Danny Hawthorne-Foss - baritone saxophone

Sinta Quartet are currently managed by General Arts Touring.

Awards and recognition 
1st Prize of the 2012 North American Saxophone Alliance Quartet Competition.
Alice Coleman Grand Prize of the 2013 Coleman Chamber Music Competition.
1st Prize of the 2013 Concert Artists Guild Competition.
1st Prize for Winds of the 2017 M-Prize Chamber Arts Competition.
Gold Medal at the 2018 Fischoff National Chamber Music Competition.

Recordings 

 "Collider" Released 6/9/2019 on Concert Artists Guild Records.
"Ex Machina" Release Date 2/28/2020 on Bright Shiny Things.

References 

Saxophone quartets
University of Michigan
Musical groups established in 2010
2010 establishments in Michigan